Margaret Sibella Brown (March 2, 1866November 16, 1961) was a Canadian bryologist specializing in mosses and liverworts native to Nova Scotia.  Although lacking formal scientific training, she has been recognized for her contributions to bryology and as an authority on the mosses and liverworts of Nova Scotia.  Samples she collected are now housed at major herbaria in North America and Europe.

Family and early life 

Margaret Sibella Brown was born on March 2, 1866, in Sydney Mines, Nova Scotia.  She had a twin sister, Elizabeth Purves (1866–1951), as well as three younger siblings: Annie Ethel (1869–1918), Richard Charles (1872–1951), and Lillian Seward (1878–1967).

Brown's grandfather, Richard Brown (1805–1882) was born in Lowther, England.  In 1825, he moved to Cape Breton, Nova Scotia, to take an engineering position at the coal mines there, eventually becoming general manager.  In 1834, he met Margaret's grandmother, Margaret Sibella Barrington (1836–1854) whom he married that year.  One of the couple's six children was Brown's father, Richard Henry (1837–1920), who took over as general manager of the mines when his father retired in 1864 and returned to England.

In 1864, Richard Henry married Barbara Davison (1842–1898) in Pictou, after which they lived in Sydney Mines where they raised a family and he served as the town's first mayor.

Brown had a paternal aunt, also named Margaret Sibella Brown (1836–1854).  Sibella Annie Barrington was related through Brown's grandfather, Richard Brown.

Education 
Brown's early education was at the Anglican School for Girls and Kings College in Halifax, from which she graduated with a bachelor of arts.  She then attended the Anglo-German Institute, a finishing school in Stuttgart, Germany, from 1883 to 1884, and also studied in London. After returning to Nova Scotia in 1885, she attended the Victoria School of Art and Design (now NSCAD University).

Scientific career 
As a bryologist, Brown mainly collected and classified mosses and liverworts native to Nova Scotia.  Most of her work was in Cape Breton, but she also collected specimens from Trinidad, Puerto Rico, Spain, France, and Jamaica.  

During Brown's lifetime, women scientists were unusual and there is little contemporaneous record of her scientific career. She published at least scientific eight papers. Her first paper, published in 1932 in The Bryologist, describes the new moss species Entosthodon neoscoticus. In 1936, she published an extensive catalogue of Nova Scotian mosses and hepatics in Proceedings of the Nova Scotian Institute of Science. A 1937 paper categorized a collection of moss samples gathered in Syria by William Bacon Evans.  

Brown worked with Elizabeth Gertrude Britton, Nathaniel Lord Britton, and Joseph Edward Little, as co-collectors of specimens.  She went on one expedition to Puerto Rico with Elizabeth and Nathaniel Britton in January 1922, with a planned duration of ten weeks.  The results of that expedition were presented in April of that year.

Society and board memberships 
Brown belonged to the Moss Exchange Club (later known as the British Bryological Society) and the Sullivant Moss Society (later known as the American Bryological and Lichenological Society). She was president of the Halifax Floral Society.  Before she died at the age of 95, she was the oldest living member of the Nova Scotian Institute of Science.

Brown served on the board of the Victoria School of Art and Design and was a member of its education committee.  During World War I, she was honorary secretary of the Halifax branch of the Canadian Red Cross Society.

Honours 

Brown was awarded an honorary M.A. from Acadia University on May 16, 1950, at the age of 84. She was offered an honorary Ph.D., which she declined in favour of the M.A. The graduation program noted that she was "probably the chief Maritime authority on mosses and liverworts".  In 1934, she received an honorary diploma from the Victoria School of Art and Design.  Brown was inducted into the Nova Scotia Scientific Hall of Fame in 2010.

In an invited paper at the 1976 annual meeting of the American Society of Bryology and Lichenology, Brown was listed as one of "the more important North American muscologists and collectors", noting that she was among those who "made the most lasting impact on muscology".

Collections 
The E.C. Smith Herbarium at Acadia University contains her collection of 1779 mosses, 858 hepatics, and 53 lichens.  Other of her specimens are in the collections of the British Museum, New York Botanical Garden, Dalhousie University, the New Brunswick Museum, the Nova Scotia Museum of Natural History, the Devonian Botanical Garden at the University of Alberta, the Yale University Herbarium, and the Harvard University Herbaria.

Death 
Brown died in her Halifax home on November 16, 1961.  There is some question about the date of death; most sources give it as November 15. Her official death certificate says November 16, which is used here.

Brown's middle name is variously spelled Sibella, Sybella, or Sebella, in different sources. Although her death certificate uses Sebella, Sibella is used in this article, as that is the spelling most commonly used in sources talking about her scientific career.

References

Additional reading 
 Biography of Sibella's grandfather, Richard Brown.  
 Margaret Sibella Brown on Bionomia.

Women bryologists
19th-century Canadian botanists
People from the Cape Breton Regional Municipality
1866 births
1961 deaths
Members of the British Bryological Society
19th-century Canadian women scientists
20th-century Canadian women scientists
Canadian women botanists
20th-century Canadian botanists